Elections for the members of the Senate were held on November 10, 1953 in the Philippines. Incumbent President Elpidio Quirino of the Liberal Party lost his opportunity to get a second full term as President of the Philippines to former Defense Secretary Ramon Magsaysay of the Nacionalista Party. Quirino's running mate, Senator Jose Yulo lost to Senator Carlos P. Garcia. Vice President Fernando Lopez did not run for re-election and ran for the Senate instead, in which he emerged as the candidate with the most votes. This was the first time that an elected president did not come from the Senate. To further compound the Liberal Party's woes, they also failed to win any seats in the Senate in this election.

The Citizens' Party and the Democratic Party caucused with the Nacionalistas to provide them the majority in the Senate.

Retiring incumbents
All senators whose seats were up contested the election.

Mid-term vacancy
Emiliano Tria Tirona (Liberal), died on April 8, 1952

Other changes
Claro M. Recto (Nacionalista) won an electoral protest against Senator Teodoro de Vera (Liberal) in the Senate Electoral Tribunal. Recto was seated on April 3, 1953.

Incumbents running elsewhere 
These ran in the middle of their Senate terms. For those losing in their respective elections, they can still return to the Senate to serve out their term, while the winners will vacate their Senate seats, then it would have been contested in a special election concurrently with the next general election.

 Carlos P. Garcia (Nacionalista), ran for vice president and won

Results
The Nacionalista Party won five seats contested in the election, with the Democratic Party winning two, and the Citizens' Party winning one.

Nacionalista Eulogio Rodriguez and Lorenzo Tañada of the Citizens' Party both defended their Senate seats. The four Liberal senators whose seats were up in this election were defeated: Camilo Osias, Geronima Pecson, Pablo Angeles y David and Vicente Madrigal. Felixberto Verano, who won a special election in 1951, was the sole Nacionalista defeat.

Three winners are neophyte Nacionalista senators: Alejo Mabanag, Edmundo B. Cea and Emmanuel Pelaez.

Incumbent vice president and Democrat Fernando Lopez returned to the Senate after serving from 1947 to 1949. Mariano Jesús Cuenco, who was defeated in the last election, made a comeback in the Senate, this time under the banner of the Nacionalistas.

Senator Carlos P. Garcia of the Nacionalistas was elected vice president in concurrent elections; his seat will be vacant until 1955 when it would have been contested in a special election.

Key:
 ‡ Seats up
 + Gained by a party from another party
 √ Held by the incumbent
 * Held by the same party with a new senator
^ Vacancy

Per candidate

Per party
The seat vacated by the death of Emiliano Tria Tirona in 1952 was disputed in this election.

The Nacionalistas originally had 14 seats entering the 3rd Congress, but the election of Senator Carlos P. Garcia to the vice presidency meant that his seat is vacant until 1955, when it was contested in a special election.

See also
Commission on Elections
3rd Congress of the Philippines

References

External links
 The Philippine Presidency Project
 Official website of the Commission on Elections

1953
Senate election